Dhanusha District,, a part of Madhesh Province, is one of the seventy-seven districts of Nepal. It is situated in the Outer Terai.

During the elections in April 2008, the district was divided into seven constituencies. It is also the home district of the first president of Nepal, Dr. Ram Baran Yadav, who contested and won the elections from constituency 5. As a political center of the region, it has prominent leaders like Bimalendra Nidhi (Former Deputy Prime Minister of Nepal), Anand Prasad Dhungana, Mahendra Yadav and Ram Krishna Yadav from the Nepali Congress, Anand Yadav (Gangaram Yadav ) from the CPN-UML, Matrika Yadav from the CPN-Maoist and Ram Chandra Jha from CPN (Unified Socialist) who have been ministers at various point of time and are still active.

The most common language spoken in Dhanusha is Maithili.

Dhanusha district has an airport and the only railway system of Nepal which connects Janakpurdham with an Indian town, Jayanagar. It has several good hotels like Hotel Rama, Hotel Sita Palace, including the starred hotel, Hotel Welcome, Sitasaran hotel and Happy hotel. It also has the Janakpur Zonal Hospital and several private hospitals.

Geography and climate

Economy
Agriculture is the major economy of the Dhanusha district. About 90% of citizens of this district are involved in the cultivation of wheat and rice. Rice is the major output. Dhanusha still relies mostly on old age techniques such as bullock-cart for transportation and bull plow for tilling the agriculture fields. However, there is a slow introduction to modern techniques such as a tractor for good transportation (for agriculture purposes), thrasher, and so on. Remittances make up a large portion of its GDP.

Demographics

Languages

Administration 

The district consists of one sub-metropolitan city, eleven urban municipalities and six rural municipalities. These are as follows:

 Janakpur Sub Metropolitan City
 Chhireshwarnath Municipality
 Ganeshman Charanath 
  Dhanusadham Municipality 
  Nagarain Municipality 
 Bideha Municipality
 Mithila Municipality
 Sahidnagar Municipality
 Sabaila Municipality
 Kamala Municipality
  Mithila Bihari Municipality 
 Hansapur Municipality
  Janaknandani Rural Municipality 
 Bateshwar Rural Municipality
  Mukhiyapatti Musharniya Rural Municipality 
  Lakshminya Rural Municipality 
 Aurahi Rural Municipality
  Dhanauji Rural Municipality

Former municipalities and VDCs

 Andupatti
 Aurahi
 Baphai
 Bagchaura
 Baheda Bala
 Bahuarba
 Balabakhar
 Balaha Kathal
 Balaha Saghara
 Ballagoth
 Baniniya
 Baramajhiya
 Basahiya
 Basbitti
 Bateshwar
 Bega Shivapur
 Begadawar
 Bharatpur
 Bhuchakrapur
 Bhutahi Paterwa
 Bindhi
 Bisarbhora
 Chakkar
 Chireswarnath
 Chora Koilpur
 Debadiha
 Deuri Parbaha
 Devpura Rupetha
 Dhabauli
 Dhalkebar
 Dhanauji
 Dhanusadham Municipality
 Dubarikot Hathalekha
 Duhabi
 Ekarahi
 Ganeshman Charanath Municipality
 Ghodghans
 Giddha
 Godar
 Gopalpur
 Goth Kohelpur
 Hansapur Kathpula
 Harine
 Hathipur Harbara
 Inarwa
 Itaharwa
 Janakpur Sub Metropolis
 Jhatiyahi
 Jhojhi Kataiya
 Kachuri Thera
 Kajara Ramaul
 Kanakpatti
 Khajuri Chanha
 Khariyani
 Kurtha
 Labatoli
 Lagmamdha Guthi
 Lakhauri
 Lakkad
 Lakshminibas
 Lakshmipur Bagewa
 Lohana Bahbangama
 Machijhitakaiya
 Mahuwa (Pra. Ko)
 Mahuwa (Pra. Khe)
 Makhanaha
 Manshingpatti
 Mithileshwar Nikash
 Mithileshwar Mauwahi
 Mithila Municipality
 Mukhiyapatti Mushargiya
 Nagarain
 Nakatajhijh
 Nauwakhor Prashahi
 Nunpatti
 Pachaharwa
 Papikleshwar
 Patanuka
 Paterwa
 Paudeshwar
 Phulgama
 Puspalpur
 Raghunathpur
 Rampur Birta
 Sabaila Municipality
 Sapahi
 Satosar
 Shantipur
 Siddha
 Singyahi Maidan
 Sinurjoda
 Sonigama
 Suga Madhukarahi
 Suganikash
 Tarapatti Sirsiya
 Thadi Jhijha
 Thilla Yaduwa
 Tulsi Chauda
 Tulsiyahi Nikas
 Tulsiyani Jabdi
 Yadukush
 Yagyabhumi

Notable people 

 Mahendra Narayan Nidhi, democracy fighter and recipient of second highest honour, the Rastra Gaurav Man Padavi
 Ram Baran Yadav, First president of Federal Democratic Republic of Nepal
 Bimalendra Nidhi, Nepali Congress Vice president and former Deputy prime minister and Home Minister of Nepal 
 Ram Chandra Jha, former Minister and secretariat member of CPN (Unified Socialist)
 Mahendra Yadav, Nepali Congress Deputy General Secretary and former Minister for Water Supply

Chandra Mohan Yadav, member of Nepalese Constituent Assembly
Raghubir Mahaseth, CPN (UML) secretary and former Minister for Physical Development
Minakshi Jha and Smriti Narayan Chaudhary, Nepali Congress leaders and member of House of Representatives

Ministers of Federal government 

 
 Ram Krishna Yadav, Nepali Congress leader and former Minister for Agriculture 
 Umashankar Argariya, MJFN (Loktantrik) leader and Minister for Culture, Tourism and Civil Aviation
 Ananda Prasad Dhungana, Nepali Congress leader and former Minister for Forest and Soil Conservation

Minister of provincial government 

 Ram Saroj Yadav, current Minister for Physical Infrastructure Development
 Satrudhan Mahato, current Minister for Industry, Tourism and Forest

References

External links

Dhanusa District map at Digital Himalaya
Nepal Maps

 
Districts of Nepal established in 1962
Districts of Madhesh Province